The Murphyverse is the unofficial name given to the line of American comic books published by DC Comics under its Black Label imprint.

Development 
Following the critical and commercial success of Batman: White Knight (2017–18) and its sequel Batman: Curse of the White Knight (2019–20) — both limited series created by Sean Murphy — DC Comics was reportedly interested in creating a comic book line centered around Murphy's works, with him overseeing the making of each comic as they are developed by different creative teams and then published by DC under its Black Label imprint. Although it currently does not have an official name, the line is commonly referred to as the "Murphyverse".

In revealing his comic book line, Murphy laid out six rules that all writers and illustrators must follow when creating series for the Murphyverse: the first rule says that any character that dies cannot be revived; the second rule is that there can be no internal monologues; the third rule states that no series can be rushed; the fourth rule declares that the authors of the books must have as their primary focus the goal of pleasing their readers; the fifth rule expresses that there must be at least one vehicle — such as the Batmobile — in each comic; and the sixth and final rule establishes that no series may crossover with another, despite taking place in the same shared universe.

While the Murphyverse has so far focused on the superhero Batman and his overall cast of supporting characters, Murphy has indicated that he plans to expand the line with the release of comics based on other DC characters and teams such as Superman and the Justice League. In August 2022, Murphy said that his comic book line is DC's equivalent of Marvel Comics' Ultimate imprint: "I feel like I've got all the freedom in the world and my own universe, Batman. I mean, like, everyone wants that. So I don't know how I ended up here. But it's like Marvel's Ultimate Line but with Gotham [City]".

Publications

Featured titles

Collected editions

See also 
 The Sandman Universe

References 

2017 in comics
2017 comics debuts
Comics by Sean Murphy
DC Comics dimensions
DC Comics lines
DC Comics planets
Murphyverse
Superhero comics